Calamagrostis purpurascens, is a perennial grass commonly known as purple reedgrass, purple pinegrass, or alpine reedgrass.

Description
Calamagrostis purpurascens is a large, clump forming, perennial grass; growing 30-80 cm (12-31 in.) tall. It grows from short rhizomes and has dense, often purpled tinted flower heads that are 4 to 13 cm (1.6 to 5.1 in.) long. It has one flowered spikelets, two subequal glumes, and lemma with a dorsal awn. The awn is longer than the glum and sharply bent, and longer than the tip of the spiklet. Flowering stems have typically one or two leaves.

Distribution
Calamagrostis purpurascens is native from arctic Greenland, to much of Canada (Alberta, British Columbia, Manitoba, Newfoundland, Northwest Territories, Nunavut, Ontario, Quebec, Saskatchewan, and Yukon Territory) and the western and northern U.S. (Alaska, California, Colorado, Idaho, Minnesota, Montana, Nevada, New Mexico, Oregon, South Dakota, Utah, Washington, and Wyoming). It is rare and scattered in the southern U.S. states, such as Louisiana, where it is a post-glacial relict.

Further south, C. purpurascens is also known in Chile, where it was recorded by Rodolfo Amando Philippi in 1860. Philippi gave it the name Deyeuxia robusta, now relegated to synonymy.

It is also found in Asia (in eastern Siberia).

Habitat
Calamagrostis purpurascens grows in dry mountainous zones, from high up on the foothills to close to the snow-line, often taking root in gaps in the talus, where few other plants can grow. It is an arctic-alpine species with disjunct boreal populations in eastern North America. In Minnesota it is an endangered species found growing in the north eastern part of the state in the coniferous region in Cook county where it is found on tall north facing cliffs composed of slate and diabase; these locations are cool, moist, and lack heavy competition from other plant species.

Ecology
Carterocephalus palaemon (arctic skipper) butterflies eat the nectar from C. purpurascens flowers, and their caterpillars feed on the shoots. Ovis canadensis (bighorn sheep) are known to graze this grass.

References

purpurascens
Plants described in 1823
Bunchgrasses of North America
Flora of Siberia
Butterfly food plants
Taxa named by Robert Brown (botanist, born 1773)